Guiducci is an Italian surname. Notable people with the surname include:

Armanda Guiducci (1923–1992), Italian writer, literary critic, and Marxist feminist
Carlotta Guiducci (born 1977), Italian bio-engineer
Mario Guiducci (1583–1646), Italian scholar and writer

Italian-language surnames